Escarpment Blues is a Canadian concert and documentary film starring singer-songwriter Sarah Harmer. Directed by Andy Keen and produced by Keen, Harmer, Bryan Bean and Patrick Sambrook, it was released theatrically in 2006.

In June 2005, Harmer launched a tour, called I Love the Escarpment, across southern Ontario to promote Protecting Escarpment Rural Land (PERL), a conservation group she cofounded to battle a proposed quarry development on the Niagara Escarpment near her hometown of Burlington. Harmer toured communities near the escarpment, both performing and speaking about the PERL campaign. The film documents both her live performances and her activist work from the tour, and takes its name from "Escarpment Blues", a song from her 2005 album I'm a Mountain.

Poet Tanis Rideout also participated in the PERL tour and appears in the film.

Escarpment Blues won the award for Best Music DVD at the 2007 Juno Awards.

References

External links
 Escarpment Blues

2006 films
English-language Canadian films
Canadian documentary films
Sarah Harmer albums
Niagara Escarpment
2006 documentary films
Documentary films about nature
2000s English-language films
2000s Canadian films